Leucoptera scammatias is a moth in the family Lyonetiidae that is endemic to South Africa.

References

Leucoptera (moth)
Endemic moths of South Africa
Moths described in 1909